CWA or Cwa may refer to:

Organisations
 CWA Constructions, a Swiss manufacturer of gondolas and people mover cabins, a division of Doppelmayr Garaventa Group
 Catch Wrestling Association, a former German professional wrestling promotion
 Continental Wrestling Association, based in Memphis, Tennessee
 Civil Works Administration, a New Deal era agency in the US
 College of West Anglia, a college in Norfolk, England
 Country Women's Association, Australian Rural Women's Group
 Crime Writers' Association, a British organisation
 Concerned Women for America, a conservative Christian lobbying group in the US
 Cardroom Workers' Amalgamation, a defunct British trade union
 Communications Workers of America, a labor union

Science and technology
 Closed-world assumption, formalisms of knowledge representation
 Cognitive work analysis, a framework for describing complex systems
 County Warning Area, a forecast region for which the US National Weather Service issues individual weather reports
 Cwa, in Köppen climate classification, is one of the humid subtropical climates with monsoonal influences
 Corona-Warn-App, a COVID-19 contact tracing mobile app

Other uses
 Canada Wildlife Act
 Cwa people, non-Mbuti Pygmies of the Democratic Republic of the Congo
 Chessington World of Adventures, an amusement park in Surrey, England
 Central Wisconsin Airport (IATA code)
 Conference on World Affairs, at University of Colorado, Boulder, US
 CEN Workshop Agreement, a reference document from the European Committee for Standardization
 Clean Water Act, an environmental law in the US
 Choi Wan station, Hong Kong (MTR station code)